Erlanger is a very deep lunar impact crater that lies near the north pole of the Moon. Due to its position near the lunar north pole (and given that the Moon's axis is only tilted about 1.5°), sunlight only rarely falls on the bottom, and the 2008 Chandrayaan-1 probe hoped to find that ice from comet impacts had accumulated there. Erlanger is one of the Moon's permanently shadowed craters.

The crater was named by the International Astronometrical Union on January 22, 2009, after the American physiologist and 1944 Nobel Prize winner Joseph Erlanger.

References

External links
 Article about Erlanger by Dr. Phil Plait 
 USGS Gazetteer of Planetary Nomenclature entry for Erlanger
 Announcement of the assignation of the crater name

Impact craters on the Moon